Tay may refer to:

People and languages
 Tay (name), including lists of people with the given name, surname and nickname
 Tay people, an ethnic group of Vietnam
 Tày language
Atayal language, an Austronesian language spoken in Taiwan (ISO 639-3 code "tay")
TAY (singer), Portuguese singer Tiago Amaral (born 1999)

Places
 River Tay, a river in Scotland
 Tay Bridge, a railway bridge that collapsed, killing all on board a train
 Loch Tay, a freshwater loch
 Firth of Tay, the estuary into which the Tay flows
 Tay, Ontario, Canada, a township
 Tay River, Ontario, Canada
 Tay Canal, a part of the river
 Tay Sound, Nunavut, Canada
 Tay, Iran
 Tay, Ardabil, Iran
 Lough Tay, a lake in County Wicklow, Ireland
 Tay Head, Antarctica
Firth of Tay (Antarctica)
 Tayside, a former local government area in Scotland

Science and technology
 Tay (bot), an AI chatbot released by Microsoft in 2016
 Rolls-Royce RB.44 Tay, a turbojet aircraft engine
 Rolls-Royce RB.183 Tay, a turbofan aircraft engine

Transportation and military
 , the name of several Royal Navy ships
 ASL Airlines Belgium, formerly TNT Airways, ICAO airline code TAY
 Tartu Airport, Estonia, IATA code TAY

Other uses
 Tay (treasurer), a high official of Ancient Egypt
 Radio Tay, a group of three Independent Local Radio stations in Scotland
 Tay FM
 Tay 2
 Tay, a fictional location in the video game Riven
 University of Tampere (Finnish: Tampereen yliopisto (Tay)), a university in Finland

See also

 Tai (disambiguation)
 Taytay (disambiguation)
 Tays (disambiguation)
 Thay (disambiguation)
 Tayy, an ancient Arab tribe

Language and nationality disambiguation pages